Ghost is a 1990 American romantic fantasy film directed by Jerry Zucker from a screenplay by Bruce Joel Rubin, and starring Patrick Swayze, Demi Moore, Whoopi Goldberg, Tony Goldwyn, Vincent Schiavelli, and Rick Aviles. The plot centers on Sam Wheat (Swayze), a murdered banker, whose ghost sets out to save his girlfriend, Molly Jensen (Moore), from the person who killed him – through the help of the psychic Oda Mae Brown (Goldberg).

Ghost was theatrically released on July 13, 1990, to commercial success, grossing $505 million against a budget of $22–23 million and emerging as the highest-grossing film of 1990 and at the time of its release, was the third-highest-grossing film of all time. The film received positive reviews from critics, with particular praise going towards the score and performances of the cast. Ghost earned five nominations at the 63rd Academy Awards: Best Picture, Best Original Score, Best Film Editing, and winning Best Supporting Actress for Goldberg and Best Original Screenplay for Rubin.

Plot
Banker Sam Wheat and his girlfriend, artist Molly Jensen, renovate and move into a Manhattan loft with the help of Sam's friend and co-worker Carl Bruner. One night, after attending the theater with Molly, Sam is killed when a mugger tries to steal his wallet. Sam is shocked to realize he is a ghost, but when angels appear to take his soul to Heaven, he returns to Molly.

Weeks later, in an effort to raise her spirits, Carl takes Molly for a walk. When the mugger enters their apartment in search of something a few minutes later, Sam scares their cat into attacking him and he flees. Sam follows the mugger, Willie Lopez, back to his apartment, and learns that the mugging was not random, when Willie makes a call to an unknown person promising to return to Sam and Molly's apartment to continue looking for what he was trying to find before. 

After leaving Willie's apartment, Sam comes across Oda Mae Brown's psychic reading parlor where, along with her sisters, she takes people's money then pretends to contact their deceased loved ones. When Oda Mae hears Sam's voice, she realizes she must have inherited her mother's true psychic gift. After Sam's singing keeps her awake late one night, she agrees to tell Molly about Willie. Molly in turn goes to the police, but after they inform her there isn't a file for Willie and show her Oda Mae's lengthy criminal record that includes fraud charges and several aliases, she gives up, believing she has been deceived.

Sam is furious when he finds out it was Carl who had Willie attack him to obtain his book of bank passwords so he can transfer laundered money for drug dealers in several accounts into one account under the fictitious name "Rita Miller".

Determined to protect Molly, Sam enlists the help of a much more troubled and violent ghost (who he encountered earlier when following Willie to his apartment) to teach him how to move ordinary objects. After succeeding, Sam convinces Oda Mae (who is now able to hear other spirits talking) to pose as "Rita Miller" and withdraw the money, which he has her give to charity. Sam starts to haunt Carl, who becomes frantic to find the money once he realizes it has been withdrawn. Carl visits Molly and learns that Rita Miller is actually Oda Mae.

Sam warns Oda Mae and her sisters about Carl and Willie just before they arrive. Sam terrorizes Willie so much that Wille runs into the street screaming and is hit by a car and killed. 
As Carl flees, demons drag Willie's soul to Hell.

After Molly calls the police, Oda Mae lets Sam possess her body and he slow-dances with Molly, unaware that using her body saps his energy. Carl forces his way into Molly's apartment while she and Oda Mae flee upstairs to another apartment that is under construction. Carl holds Molly at gunpoint and demands the money Oda Mae withdrew from the bank. Sam, now recovered, frees her and pushes a heavy scaffold onto Carl, crippling him. After Carl swings a metal hook at Sam and it swings back, it shatters a pane of glass that slides down a wooden shaft and impales Carl in the chest, killing him. The same demons that took away Willie's soul also take Carl's to Hell.

Sam finds Molly and Oda Mae and asks if they are alright. Both women are surprised and relieved to find they can hear and see him. As heavenly light shines down on him, Sam tells Oda Mae her mother would be proud of her and tells Molly he loves her. They share a kiss and Sam walks into the light to join the angels in heaven.

Cast

 Patrick Swayze as Sam Wheat
 Demi Moore as Molly Jensen
 Whoopi Goldberg as Oda Mae Brown
 Tony Goldwyn as Carl Bruner
 Rick Aviles as Willie Lopez
 Vincent Schiavelli as Subway Ghost
 Gail Boggs as Oda Mae's Sister, Louise
 Armelia McQueen as Oda Mae's Sister, Clara
 Phil Leeds as Emergency Room Ghost
 Augie Blunt as Orlando
 Stephen Root as Police Sgt
 Bruce Jarchow as Lyle Ferguson

Production

Background and filming
Ghost was the first film Jerry Zucker directed on his own, as well as his first dramatic film. He had previously been part of the Zucker, Abrahams and Zucker directing team, known for their parody films. Zucker stated that his decision to direct Ghost was not made to distance himself from comedies or to mark a new chapter in his career, but was merely "just looking for a good film to direct."

Harrison Ford, Michael J. Fox, Paul Hogan, Tom Hanks, Kevin Bacon, Kevin Kline, Alec Baldwin and Tom Cruise were considered for the role of Sam Wheat. Bruce Willis turned down the role of Sam Wheat as he did not understand the script and later called himself a "knucklehead" for turning it down. Michelle Pfeiffer, Molly Ringwald,  Meg Ryan,  Julia Roberts and Nicole Kidman were considered for the role of Molly Jensen. Tina Turner and Oprah Winfrey auditioned for the role of Oda Mae Brown.  According to Goldberg, the producers initially were not interested in casting her as Oda Mae and that Swayze advocated for her to be cast.

Zucker credited arguments from radio host Dennis Prager with deciding to "lighten" Rubin's original script with a moral message.

Rubin noted that he "wanted to tell a ghost story from the ghost's perspective": "One day, I was watching a production of Hamlet, which begins with the ghost of Hamlet's father saying, ‘Revenge my death,’" he recalled. "I thought, ‘Wow, let's transpose that into the 20th century; it'd be an interesting story.’ And the idea hit me."

Filming for Ghost began shooting in July 1989. Many of the interior scenes were shot at Paramount in Los Angeles. The interior of Sam and Molly's loft is a reproduction of the home and studio of artist Michele Oka Doner, built from plans she provided because she declined to allow filming in her loft. It was reconstructed in an unused loft nearby in her Soho neighborhood and featured many of the same details as the actual loft, such as radiators around columns, open stairs and a house-shaped enclosure for the refrigerator. The exterior scenes were shot in New York City, particularly in Bedford–Stuyvesant, Soho, and Wall Street, for about five weeks. The film features about 100 special effects shots.
Demi Moore's famous 'boy cut' in the movie was designed by Manhattan hair stylist John Sahag.

Music 

The music for Ghost was written by veteran French composer Maurice Jarre, whose work was nominated for the 1990 Academy Award for Best Original Score (won by John Barry for Dances with Wolves). The soundtrack also featured the 1955 song "Unchained Melody", composed by Alex North with lyrics by Hy Zaret. In Ghost, the song appears both in instrumental and vocal form, the latter being the version recorded by Bobby Hatfield of The Righteous Brothers in 1965.

The soundtrack album was issued worldwide on Milan Records, but licensed to Varèse Sarabande in North America. It was reissued with two extra tracks in 1995, and later as part of Milan's Silver Screen Edition series with the extra tracks and an interview with Maurice Jarre.

Release

Releases and sales
The film became an unexpected box-office success, grossing $505.7 million on a budget of between $22–23 million. It was the highest-grossing film of 1990. Box Office Mojo estimates that the film sold over 51.46 million tickets in the US. It spent eight consecutive weeks at number one at the UK box office and became the highest-grossing film of all time in the UK surpassing E.T. the Extra-Terrestrial with a gross of £23.3 million. That record would last for three years before getting surpassed by Jurassic Park in 1993. It also spent six consecutive weeks atop the Australian box office. It was also the highest-grossing film in Indonesia at the time with a gross of $3.6 million and the highest-grossing foreign film in the Philippines.

The film was released on video and LaserDisc in the United States on March 21, 1991, and sold a record 646,000 videos for rental, breaking the record set by Die Hard 2, and a record 66,040 LaserDiscs. The rentals generated a gross of $40 million for Paramount. The video went on sale in the fall and generated sales of $25 million.

Critical response
Its critical consensus reads, "Ghost offers viewers a poignant romance while blending elements of comedy, horror, and mystery, all adding up to one of the more enduringly watchable hits of its era." Metacritic (which uses a weighted average) assigned Ghost a score of 52 out of 100 based on 17 critics, indicating "mixed or average reviews". Audiences polled by CinemaScore gave the film an average grade of "A" on an A+ to F scale.

Roger Ebert gave Ghost two-and-a-half out of four stars in his review for the Chicago Sun-Times, regarding the film as "no worse an offender than most ghost movies, I suppose. It assumes that even after death we devote most of our attention to unfinished business here on Earth, and that danger to a loved one is more important to a ghost than the infinity it now inhabits." He was also critical of the film's "obligatory action climax", the "ridiculous visitation from the demons of hell", the "slow study" of the Molly character, and the "single best scene" in which Sam overtakes Oda Mae's body to caress Molly: "In strict logic, this should involve us seeing Goldberg kissing Moore, but of course the movie compromises and shows us Swayze holding her - too bad, because the logical version would actually have been more spiritual and moving."

David Ansen of Newsweek, despite finding the ending too sentimental, praised the film as "a zippy pastiche that somehow manages to seem fresh even though it's built entirely out of borrowed parts." Variety magazine called the film "an odd creation – at times nearly smothering in arty somberness, at others veering into good, wacky fun." Goldberg received considerable praise for her performance. In a review for The New York Times, Janet Maslin comments "Ms. Goldberg plays the character's amazement, irritation and great gift for back talk to the hilt. This is one of those rare occasions on which the uncategorizable Ms. Goldberg has found a film role that really suits her, and she makes the most of it." Even some writers who gave negative reviews of Ghost extended praise to Goldberg's work in the film.

Accolades

Legacy

The pottery wheel scene became widely known, and has been cited as "one of the most iconic moments of '90s cinema." It has also frequently been parodied, such as in The Naked Gun 2½: The Smell of Fear (of which Jerry Zucker served as an executive producer; it was directed by his brother David Zucker), the short British animated film Wallace and Gromit: A Matter of Loaf and Death and US TV series Two and a Half Men.

The film inspired a musical stage version, Ghost: The Musical. The show had its world premiere in Manchester, UK, in March 2011 before transferring to London from June 2011 and having its premiere on July 19, 2011. On November 13, 2010, Paramount and Shochiku released a Japanese remake of Ghost, titled . The remake stars Nanako Matsushima, South Korean actor Song Seung-heon, and veteran actress Kirin Kiki. In this film, the ghost is a woman, played by Matsushima.

On January 17, 2023, it was revealed by Vanity Fair that Channing Tatum and his company, Free Association, has the rights to the film from Paramount and announced his plans to produce, and star in, a remake of the film with him playing Swayze's role.

The 2023 BET+ original film The Reading pays tribute as an Easter egg naming a minor character Oda M. Brown, though not fully named Oda 'Mae' Brown, nor any relation or connection to the film Ghost. However, the movie's plot deals with the supernatural psychic readings of the deceased. Browns daughter Sky, performs spiritual readings for Emma Leeden (Mo'Nique) in a similar exorcism style Oda Mae Brown did with her clients possessing the souls of the departed. The film is written and directed by Courtney Glaude and is executive produced by Lee Daniels.

See also
 List of ghost films

References

External links

 
 
 
 
 

1990 films
1990s fantasy drama films
1990s ghost films
1990 romantic drama films
1990s romantic fantasy films
American films about revenge
American ghost films
American romantic drama films
American romantic fantasy films
Demons in film
American fantasy drama films
Films about invisibility
Films about banking
Films about couples
Films about grieving
Films about murder
Films about psychic powers
Films about spirit possession
Films about the afterlife
Films adapted into plays
Films directed by Jerry Zucker
Films scored by Maurice Jarre
Films featuring a Best Supporting Actress Academy Award-winning performance
Films featuring a Best Supporting Actress Golden Globe-winning performance
Films set in New York City
Films shot in New York City
Films whose writer won the Best Original Screenplay Academy Award
Films with screenplays by Bruce Joel Rubin
Paramount Pictures films
American supernatural drama films
American supernatural romance films
Limbo
1990s English-language films
1990s American films